The men's 100 metres sprint event at the 2008 Olympic Games took place on 15 and 16 August at the Beijing National Stadium. Eighty athletes from 64 nations competed. Each nation was limited to 3 athletes per rules in force since the 1930 Olympic Congress. The final was won by Jamaican Usain Bolt in a world record time of 9.69 seconds. It was Jamaica's first title in the event, and first medal in the event since 1976. Jamaica became the first country to join the men's 100 metre winners since Trinidad and Tobago, also in 1976; Richard Thompson won that country's fourth overall medal in the event with his silver.

Holding a considerable lead 70 metres into the race, Bolt opened his arms in celebration before slapping his chest. British athlete and television presenter Kriss Akabusi criticized this gesture as showboating, noting that it cost Bolt an even faster record time. IOC president Jacques Rogge also criticized Bolt's actions as disrespectful. Bolt denied that this was the purpose of his mid-race celebration by saying "I wasn't bragging. When I saw I wasn't covered, I was just happy."

Summary

Prior to the 2008 season, Usain Bolt was known as a 200-metre sprinter, having set the world youth best in the event four years earlier.  He only dabbled in the 100 metres the year before with a one-off race in Rethymno.  While people were impressed with his 10.03, it didn't strike fear in the 9.9 sprinters around the world.  In early May, he talked his coach into letting him try the 100 again, his 9.76 was the second fastest in history, only .02 behind fellow Jamaican Asafa Powell's world record.  At the end of the month he entered another 100 metres at the Adidas Grand Prix in New York City. The result was a new world record 9.72.

While Bolt's slow starts were seen as a liability, once he got moving, nobody seemed able to match his top end speed.  He easily had the fastest times in both the quarterfinal and semi-final rounds, while injured Gay and Obikwelu were eliminated.  The center lanes of the final, reserved for the fastest qualifiers, included Bolt, Powell, Dix and another collegiate phenom from LSU, Richard Thompson.

In the final, the third Jamaican in the race, Michael Frater got the best start, along with Thompson and Darvis Patton.  30 metres into the race, Bolt was into his full running position and had pulled even with the leader, Thompson.  By the next 20 metres, Bolt was simply pulling away, with Thompson breaking up a Jamaican sweep of Frater and Powell.  20 metres before the finish, already with a 3-metre lead, Bolt held out his arms in celebration.  Behind him, Dix and Churandy Martina were making a late rush to pick off Frater and Powell.  Turning to look back at his vanquished competition, Bolt crossed the finish line sideways, still with the "showboating" and lack of form, his time was a new world record, 9.69.  Thompson later said "I could see him slowing down ahead as I was still pumping away."

Background

This was the twenty-sixth time the event was held, having appeared at every Olympics since the first in 1896. Four finalists from 2004 returned: silver medalist Francis Obikwelu of Portugal, fifth-place finisher Asafa Powell of Jamaica, sixth-place finisher Kim Collins of Saint Kitts and Nevis, and Aziz Zakari of Ghana, who had been unable to finish the final. Collins and Zakari had also been to the final in 2000. Defending gold medalist Justin Gatlin was banned at the time for failing a second drugs test, testing positive for testosterone.

In Gatlin's absence, the United States team was led by Tyson Gay, the reigning world champion, but who had suffered a hamstring injury at the U.S. trials. An ascendant Jamaican team included Powell, who had held the world record from 2005 to 2008, and Usain Bolt, who had taken the world record in May 2008.

The Czech Republic, the Marshall Islands, and Tuvalu appeared in the event for the first time. The United States made its 25rd appearance in the event, most of any country, having missed only the boycotted 1980 Games.

Qualification

Each National Olympic Committee (NOC) was able to enter up to three entrants providing they had met the A qualifying standard (10.21) in the qualifying period (1 January 2007 to 23 July 2008). NOCs were also permitted to enter one athlete providing he had met the B standard (10.28) in the same qualifying period.

Competition format

The event retained the same basic four round format introduced in 1920: heats, quarterfinals, semifinals, and a final. The "fastest loser" system, introduced in 1968, was used again to ensure that the quarterfinals and subsequent rounds had exactly 8 runners per heat; this time, the system was used in both the heats and quarterfinals.

The first round consisted of 10 heats, each with 8 or 9 athletes. The top three runners in each heat advanced, along with the next ten fastest runners overall. This made 40 quarterfinalists, who were divided into 5 heats of 8 runners. The top three runners in each quarterfinal advanced, with one "fastest loser" place. The 16 semifinalists competed in two heats of 8, with the top four in each semifinal advancing to the eight-man final.

Records

Prior to this competition, the existing world and Olympic records were as follows:

The following new world and Olympic records were set during this competition.

Schedule

All times are China Standard Time (UTC+8)

Disqualification

Eight years after the event, the IOC reanalyzed doping samples and disqualified Samuel Francis for having stanozolol in his sample.

Results

Heats

The first round was held on 15 August. The first three runners of each heat plus the next ten overall fastest runners qualified for the second round.

Heat 1

Heat 2

Heat 3

Heat 4

Heat 5

Heat 6

Heat 7

Heat 8

Heat 9

Heat 10

Quarterfinals

The quarterfinals were held on 15 August. The first three runners of each heat plus the next overall fastest runner qualified for the semifinals.

Quarterfinal 1

Quarterfinal 2

Quarterfinal 3

Quarterfinal 4

Quarterfinal 5

Semifinals

The semifinals were held on 16 August. The first four runners from each semifinal qualified for the final.

Semifinal 1

Semifinal 2

Final

The final was held on 16 August.

References

External links
Results

Men's 00100 metres
100 metres at the Olympics
Men's events at the 2008 Summer Olympics